The Sydney central business district (CBD) is the historical and main commercial centre of Sydney. The CBD is Sydney's city centre, or Sydney City, and the two terms are used interchangeably. Colloquially, the CBD or city centre is often referred to simply as "Town" or "the City". Due to its pivotal role in Australia's early history, it is one of the oldest established areas in the country.

Geographically, its north–south axis runs from Circular Quay in the north to Central railway station in the south. Its east–west axis runs from a chain of parkland that includes Hyde Park, The Domain, Royal Botanic Gardens and Farm Cove on Sydney Harbour in the east; to Darling Harbour and the Western Distributor in the west.

The Sydney City is Australia's main financial and economic centre, as well as a leading hub of economic activity for the Asia Pacific region. The city centre and areas immediately around it employ approximately 22% of the Sydney region's workforce. The City has the largest gathering of workers in the whole of Sydney. Most of them are white collar office workers in the finance and professional service industries. In 2012, the number of workers operating in the City was 226,972. Based on industry mix and relative occupational wage levels it is estimated that economic activity (GDP) generated in the city in 2015/16 was approximately $118 billion. Culturally, the city centre is Sydney's focal point for nightlife and entertainment. It is also home to some of the city's most significant buildings and structures.

Geography and urban structure 

The Sydney CBD is an area of very densely concentrated skyscrapers and other buildings, interspersed by several parks such as Hyde Park, The Domain, Royal Botanic Gardens and Wynyard Park. George Street is the Sydney CBD's main north–south thoroughfare. The streets run on a slightly warped grid pattern in the southern CBD, but in the older northern CBD the streets form several intersecting grids, reflecting their placement in relation to the prevailing breeze and orientation to Circular Quay in early settlement.

The CBD runs along two ridge lines below Macquarie Street and York Streets. Between these ridges is Pitt Street, running close to the course of the original Tank Stream (now tunneled). Bridge Street took its name from the bridge running east–west that once crossed this stream. Pitt Street is the retail heart of the city which includes the Pitt Street Mall and the Sydney Tower. Macquarie Street is a historic precinct that houses such buildings as the State Parliament House and the Supreme Court of New South Wales.

Boundaries

The New South Wales Geographical Names Board defines the area covering the central business district as the suburb named "Sydney". The formal boundaries of the suburb "Sydney"  covers most of the peninsula formed by Cockle Bay in the west and Woolloomooloo Bay in the east. It extends north to Circular Quay, Bennelong Point and Mrs Macquarie's Chair, east to Woolloomooloo Bay and the eastern boundary of the Domain and Hyde Park, south to Goulburn Street just north of Sydney's Chinatown (Haymarket), and west to cover the Darling Harbour area on the western shore of Cockle Bay. However, it does not include the northwestern portion of the peninsula which includes the Barangaroo, the Rocks, Miller's Point, Dawe's Point and Walsh Bay area, which are formally separate suburbs grouped by the City of Sydney into the "small area" called "The Rocks - Miller's Point - Dawe's Point". Although not part of the CBD, Chinatown, Haymarket, the Rocks, Miller's Point and Dawe's Point are often regarded as part of the city centre.

The postcode zone 2000 is also roughly correlative with the city centre.

"Sydney City" is very occasionally used to refer not only to the City proper, but also its nearby inner suburbs such as Pyrmont, Haymarket, Ultimo and Woolloomooloo.

City of Sydney boundaries over time
The City of Sydney is traditionally the governing authority for Sydney's city centre. However, the boundaries of the City of Sydney have always been larger than the city centre or CBD. For example, Pyrmont has been in the City of Sydney since 1842 but is usually considered to be an inner western suburb, not a part of the Sydney city centre or CBD. Today's City of Sydney is far larger than the city centre or CBD.

History 

Sydney's history begins in prehistoric times with the occupation of the district by Australian Aboriginals, whose ancestors came to Sydney in the Upper Paleolithic period. Radiocarbon dating suggests that they lived in and around Sydney for at least 30,000 years. Sydney Cove from Port Jackson to Petersham was inhabited by the Cadigal clan. The principal language groups were Darug, Guringai, and Dharawal. The modern history of the city began with the arrival of a First Fleet of British ships in 1788 and the foundation of a penal colony by Great Britain. The area surrounding Port Jackson (Sydney Harbour) was home to several Aboriginal tribes. The "Eora people" are the coastal Aboriginal people of the Sydney district. The name Eora simply means "here" or "from this place", and was used by Local Aboriginal people to describe to the British where they came from.

After arriving to Botany Bay, Captain Arthur Phillip decided that the area was not suitable since it had poor soil, no secure anchorage and no reliable water source. Thus, the fleet moved to the more suitable Port Jackson where a settlement was established at Sydney Cove on 26 January 1788. This date later became Australia's national day, Australia Day. The colony was formally proclaimed by Governor Phillip on 7 February 1788 at Sydney. Sydney Cove offered a fresh water supply and Port Jackson a safe harbour, which Phillip described as: "being without exception the finest Harbour in the World". With the expansion of European settlement large amounts of land was cleared for farming, which resulted in the destruction of Aboriginal food sources. This, combined with the introduction of new diseases such as smallpox, caused resentment within the Aboriginal clans against the British and resulted in violent confrontations.

The oldest legislative body in Australia, the New South Wales Legislative Council, was created in Sydney in 1825 as an appointed body to advise the Governor of New South Wales. The northern wing of Macquarie Street's's Rum Hospital was requisitioned and converted to accommodate the first Parliament House in 1829, as it was the largest building available in Sydney at the time. In 1840 the Sydney City Council was established. Australia's first parliamentary elections were conducted for the New South Wales Legislative Council in 1843. The passing of the Sydney Incorporation Act in 1842 officially recognised the colonial settlement as a township and imposed a managerial structure to its administration.

Macquarie set aside a large portion of land for an Anglican Cathedral and laid the foundation stone for the first St Mary's Catholic Cathedral in 1821. St Andrew's Anglican Cathedral, though more modest in size than Macquarie's original vision, later began construction and, after fire and setbacks, the present St Mary's Catholic Cathedral foundation stone was laid in 1868, from which rose a towering gothic-revival landmark. Religious groups were also responsible for many of the philanthropic activities in Sydney. One of these was the Sydney Female Refuge Society set up to care for prostitutes in 1848. An academy of art formed in 1870 and the present Art Gallery of New South Wales building began construction in 1896. Inspired by the works of French impressionism, artists camps formed around the foreshores of Sydney Harbour in the 1880s. The Romanesque landmark Queen Victoria Building (QVB), designed by George McRae, was completed in 1898 on the site of the old Sydney markets.

In the midst of World War I, on Valentine's Day, riots racked the CBD, in what has come to be known as the Central Station Riots of 1916. A substantial segment of the violence was concentrated in the Central area. These riots involved five thousand military recruits who refused to comply with extraneous parade orders. During the riots, they caused significant damage to buildings. People with "foreign" names were especially targeted. The recruits clashed with soldiers, resulting in the death of Private Ernest William Keefe. Eight people sustained injuries. Because this incident occurred in the middle of the Great War the state discouraged media coverage. Only a fifth of the rioters were court-marshalled. These riots spurred the introduction of lockout laws for pubs after 6 pm. This law was only lifted in 1955.

Governance 
Administratively, the Sydney CBD falls under the authority of the local government area of the City of Sydney. The New South Wales state government also has authority over some aspects of the CBD, in particular through Property NSW.

In the New South Wales state parliament, the seat of "Sydney" covers the city centre together with inner western, southern and eastern suburbs. Independent Alex Greenwich has represented the state seat of Sydney since the 2012 by-election, triggered by the resignation of previous independent Clover Moore, who was the Lord Mayor of Sydney, due to introduced state laws preventing dual membership of state parliament and local council.

In the federal parliament, the seat of "Sydney" covers the city centre together with a larger set of inner western, southern and eastern suburbs, as well as islands in the Sydney Harbour and Lord Howe Island. Australian Labor Party member Tanya Plibersek has represented the federal seat of Sydney since the 1998 Australian federal election.

Commercial area 

The Sydney CBD is home to some of the largest Australian companies, as well as serving as an Asia-Pacific headquarters for many large international companies. The financial services industry in particular occupies much of the available office space, with companies such as the Westpac, Commonwealth Bank of Australia, Citibank, Deutsche Bank, Macquarie Bank, AMP Limited, Insurance Australia Group, AON, Marsh, Allianz, HSBC, Axa, ABN Amro, RBC and Bloomsbury Publishing all having offices.

Transport

Sydney's CBD is serviced by commuter rail, light rail, bus and ferry transport.

Sydney's main commuter rail hub is Central railway station ("Central"), which is located to the south of the CBD in Haymarket: it connects services for almost all of the lines in the Sydney Trains network, as well as being the terminus for NSW TrainLink country and inter-urban rail services. From Central, there is a largely-underground CBD rail loop, accessed in both directions via Central, which services five CBD stations (Town Hall, Wynyard, Circular Quay, St James and Museum). This is known as the City Circle. In addition, a separate underground line to Bondi Junction services an additional underground station, Martin Place.

The Inner West Light Rail passes immediately to the south of the CBD, connecting Central to nearby suburbs of Sydney's Inner West. The CBD and South East Light Rail runs north–south through the CBD, connecting Circular Quay with Central and the south eastern suburbs.

Buses service the CBD along several dozen routes to both inner and more remote suburbs. NightRide is an after-hours bus service that operates between midnight and 5:00 am, with most services running from George Street outside the Sydney Town Hall.

Sydney Ferries operate largely from Circular Quay, on the northern edge of the CBD. There are several wharves (directly beneath the elevated Circular Quay commuter rail station), with Wharf 3 operating exclusively to Manly. There are also ferries services from the western edge of the CBD at Barangaroo.

This rapid transit line is underground in the CBD area and will link the North Shore to Bankstown via a tunnel underneath Sydney Harbour and the CBD. It is currently under construction, with a planned completion date of 2024. Construction on a separate rapid transit line to connect the CBD with the secondary centre of Parramatta is also expected to begin in late 2022.

Culture 

Sydney's cultural centre is compacted within its central business district and inner city ring, due to its nightlife, pedestrian traffic and centrality of notable attractions. There is a large concentration of cultural institutions within the CBD including: the Museum of Sydney, the State Library of New South Wales, the Customs House branch of the City of Sydney Library, the Theatre Royal, the City Recital Hall and the Japan Foundation. There are a total of 19 churches located in the Sydney city centre.

Many other cultural institutions are located at the surrounds of the CBD, such as: the Sydney Opera House and the Museum of Contemporary Art to the north, the Australian Museum and the Art Gallery of New South Wales to the east, the Powerhouse Museum to the west, White Rabbit Gallery and the Haymarket branch of the City of Sydney Library to the south. The lanes and alleyways of Sydney exhibit the culture and arts of the CBD.

Every January during the summer, the city celebrates with the Sydney Festival. There are art, music and dance exhibitions at indoor and outdoor venues. Australian and International theatre during the month is also featured, including Aboriginal, and Contemporary. Many of these events are free.

The Sydney Film Festival is an international event organised every year in June at various venues across the CBD. The festival opened on 11 June 1954 and was held over four days, with screenings at Sydney University. Attendance was at full capacity with 1,200 tickets sold at one guinea each.

Sydney boasts a lively café culture, as well as a club and bar scene distributed throughout the CBD and concentrated in a couple of locations such as Darling Harbour. Although Kings Cross is not technically located within the Sydney CBD, it is accessible via William Street, which runs through Hyde Park and is part of the inner-city region. Oxford Street hosts Sydney's gay scene.

Architecture

The Sydney CBD contains many of Australia's tallest skyscrapers, including Governor Phillip Tower, MLC Centre and World Tower, the latter consisting predominantly of apartments. It is also home to  the Australia Square tower building on George Street, which was the city's tallest building until 1976.

Sydney's CBD features a juxtaposition of old and new architecture. The old architecture dates back to Sydney's earliest days as a colony, down to the more grandiose Victorian architecture from the Gold rush era–the most substantial examples are the Queen Victoria Building and the Sydney Town Hall. Modern architectures take form as high-rises and skyscrapers, which are prolific among all of Sydney's city streets. Designed by Spain, Cosh and Minnett, the building consisted of 14 floors and cost £100,000 to build.

Heritage conservation has been an ongoing issue for Sydney's city centre since the introduction of green bans in the 1970s and the increasing need for office or living space. Since then, a number of prominent buildings in the CBD have been lost: Anthony Hordern & Sons on George Street, the Regent Theatre also on George Street, Commercial Travelers' Club and Hotel Australia at Martin Place all attracted the ire of Sydneysiders–Sydney Mayor Clover Moore, then the MP for Bligh, even addressed a crowd in Martin Place in 1988 in a futile attempt to save the Regent Theatre from its imminent fate.

Demographics

At the 2021 census, the population of the Sydney CBD was recorded as 16,667.

In the 2016 census, there were 17,252 people residing in Sydney CBD. The median age was 30 years. Children aged 0 – 14 years made up 4.5% of the population and people aged 65 years and over made up 5.7% of the population. 17.0% of the people were born in Australia. The most common countries of birth were Thailand (13.3%), China (excludes SARs and Taiwan) (11.7%), Indonesia (10.7%), South Korea (5.4%) and India (3.5%). Aboriginal and/or Torres Strait Islander people made up 0.2% of the population. 25.3% of people only spoke English at home. Other languages spoken at home included Mandarin (14.6%), Thai (13.0%), Indonesian (9.1%), Korean (5.0%) and Cantonese (4.2%). The most common ancestries in the CBD were Chinese (24.6%), Thai (11.3%), English (9.3%), Indonesian (5.1%) and Korean (4.9%). The most common responses for religion in Sydney CBD were No Religion (31.7%), Buddhism (21.7%), Not stated (15.8%), Catholic (12.6%) and Anglican (3.3%). 18.2% were couple families with children, 65.6% were couple families without children and 8.5% were one parent families. 33.4% were married. 0.2% were separate houses, 0.0% were semi-detached, row or terrace houses, townhouses etc., 98.9% were flat or apartments and 0.6% were other dwellings. 15.7% of the homes were owned outright, 13.4% were owned with a mortgage and 65.7% were rented. 49.3% were family households, 31.8% were single person households and 18.9% were group households.

See also 
 List of tallest buildings in Sydney
 Geography of Sydney
 List of suburbs in Sydney

References

External links

 
Regions of Sydney
Economy of Sydney